The Cleveland Hornets were a baseball team in the Negro National League, based in Cleveland, Ohio, in 1927. The Hornets played their home games at Hooper Field. Frank Duncan served as player-manager.

Roster

References

African-American history in Cleveland
Negro league baseball teams
Hornets
Defunct baseball teams in Ohio
Baseball teams disestablished in 1927
Baseball teams established in 1927